Zion Chapel, Chester is in Grosvenor Park Road, Chester, Cheshire, England.  It is recorded in the National Heritage List for England as a designated Grade II listed building.

The chapel was built in 1879–80 to a design by John Douglas.  It was originally a Baptist chapel.  It is built in red brick with stone dressings and the roof is of red-brown clay tiles.  It consists of an undercroft, a church and ancillary rooms.  The west end faces the road and has corner turrets.

In 1980 a congregation called the Zion Tabernacle moved into the former chapel.  In 2000 it styled itself Protestant Evangelical.

See also

Grade II listed buildings in Chester (east)
List of new churches by John Douglas

References

Churches completed in 1880
19th-century Baptist churches
19th-century Baptist churches in the United Kingdom
Grade II listed churches in Cheshire
Grade II listed buildings in Chester
John Douglas buildings
Zion Chapel